Barat, also Bharat or Bhart, is a village in Bannu District of Khyber Pakhtunkhwa, Pakistan.

References

Union councils of Bannu District
Populated places in Bannu District